Sahebganj Assembly constituency is an assembly constituency in Muzaffarpur district in the Indian state of Bihar.

Overview
As per Delimitation of Parliamentary and Assembly constituencies Order, 2008, No. 98 Sahebganj Assembly constituency is composed of the following: Sahebganj community development block;  Anadpur Kharauni, Bahdinpur, Baijalpur, Chakki Suhagpur, Chandkewari, Dewariya East, Dewariya West, Dharfari, Fatehabad, Gyaspur, Jafarpur, Jaimal Dumri, Kataru, Khutahin, Mohabbatpur, Mohjamma, Neknampur, Pandeh, Usti and Jalandhar Baitha tola, Bishunpur Saraiya gram panchayats of Paroo CD Block.

Sahebganj Assembly constituency is part of No. 16 Vaishali (Lok Sabha constituency).

Members of Legislative Assembly

Election results

2020

References

External links
 

Assembly constituencies of Bihar
Politics of Muzaffarpur district